Kaftar Kal (also Romanized as Kaftar Kār; also known as Kaftar Gār and Laftar Kār) is a village in Ashrestaq Rural District, Yaneh Sar District, Behshahr County, Mazandaran Province, Iran. At the 2006 census, its population was 75, in 23 families.

References 

Populated places in Behshahr County